Székesfehérvár is a district in central-western part of Fejér County. Székesfehérvár is also the name of the town where the district seat is found. The district is located in the Central Transdanubia Statistical Region.

Geography 
Székesfehérvár District borders with Bicske District to the northeast, Gárdony District to the east, Sárbogárd District to the south, Enying District, Balatonalmádi District and Várpalota District (Veszprém County) to the west, Mór District to the northwest. The number of the inhabited places in Székesfehérvár District is 25.

Municipalities 
The district has 1 urban county, 2 towns, 4 large villages and 18 villages.
(ordered by population, as of 1 January 2012)

The bolded municipalities are cities, italics municipalities are large villages.

See also
List of cities and towns in Hungary

References

External links
 Postal codes of the Székesfehérvár District

Districts in Fejér County